Emmanuel Hocquard (11 April 1940 – 27 January 2019) was a French poet.

Life
He grew up in Tangier, Morocco. He served as the editor of the small press Orange Export Ltd. and, with Claude Royet-Journoud, edited two anthologies of new American poets, 21+1: Poètes américains ď aujourďhui (with a corresponding English volume, 21+1 American Poets Today) and 49+1. 
In 1989, Hocquard founded and directed "Un bureau sur l'Atlantique", an association fostering relations between French and American poets.

Besides poetry, he has written essays, a novel, and translated American and Portuguese poets including Charles Reznikoff, Michael Palmer, Paul Auster, Benjamin Hollander, Antonio Cisneros, and Fernando Pessoa. With the artist Alexandre Delay, he made a video film, Le Voyage à Reykjavik.

Awards and honors
2013 Best Translated Book Award, shortlist, The Invention of Glass

Books in English translation

A Day in the Strait, translated by Maryann De Julio & Jane Staw, (Red Dust, New York, 1985); "narration"
Late Additions, translated by Rosmarie Waldrop and Connell McGrath, "Serie d'Ecriture Nº 2", (Spectacular Diseases, Peterborough, UK, 1988); poems
Elegies & Other Poems, translated by John A. Scott, (Shearsman Books, Plymouth, UK, 1989) ; poetry
Aerea in the Forests of Manhattan, translated by Lydia Davis, (The Marlboro Press, Marlboro, Vermont, 1992) ; novel
Of Mists and Clouds, translated by Mark Hutchinson, (The Noble Rider, Paris).
Elegy 7, translated by Pam Rehm & Keith Waldrop, "Serie d'Ecriture Nº 7", (Burning Deck, Providence (RI), 1993); poetry
Theory of Tables, translated by Michael Palmer, Afterword translation by Norma Cole, (Providence, RI: O-blek editions, 1994); poems
The Garden of Sallust and other writings, translated by Mark Hutchinson, (The Noble Rider, Paris, 1995).
The Library at Trieste, translated by Mark Hutchinson, (The Noble Rider, Paris) ; a talk given in 1987 at the University of California, San Diego
This Story Is Mine: Little Autobiographical Dictionary of Elegy translated by Norma Cole, (Instress, 1999); poems
Codicil & Plan for Pond 4, translated by Ray DiPalma & Juliette Valéry, (The Post Apollo Press, 1999) ; poems
A Test of Solitude: Sonnets, translated by Rosmarie Waldrop, (Burning Deck, Providence (RI), 2000) ; poems
Conditions of Light, translated by Jean-Jacques Poucel, (Fence Books/La Presse, 2010) ; poems
The Invention of Glass, translated by Cole Swensen and Rod Smith, (Canarium Books, 2012) ; poems

References

External links
"Un bureau sur l'Atlantique" site at EPC, includes detailed description of this organization
Homepage at durationpress.com includes a transcribed conversation with Royet-Journoud & poems
Steve Evans reviews "Un test de solitude" from Jacket Magazine
, a site providing an interactive reading of this Hocquard book
Audio-files @ PENNsound listen to Hocquard read from his work
AUTEURS INVITéS: Emmanuel Hocquard In French. Describes Hocquard in terms of "la modernité négative".
Emmanuel Hocquard and The Poetry of Negative Modernity a synopsis of a book project by Glenn W. Fetzer, for which he was awarded a Camargo Foundation Fellowship: 2003 (Winter-Spring)
French Poetry since 1950: Tendencies III by Jean-Michel Maulpoix
 essay by Glenn Fetzer, published by Symposium: 22 June 2002, and available at accessmylibrary.com
A Formal Type of Work: Rereading Emmanuel Hocquard by Norma Cole

1940 births
2019 deaths
People from Cannes
20th-century French poets
Prix France Culture winners
People from Tangier
French male poets
International Writing Program alumni
French male non-fiction writers
21st-century French poets
20th-century French translators
21st-century French translators